Claire Voyant was a darkwave and dream pop band from Sacramento, California. Founded by childhood friends Chris Ross and Ben Fargen. An instrumental duo until recruiting vocalist, Victoria Lloyd. Their 1995 debut has been followed by three more studio albums; Time and the Maiden in 1998, Love Is Blind in 2002 and Lustre in 2009. Eventually signing to Metropolis Records.

History

Prior to the formation of Claire Voyant, founding members (Ross, Fargen, and Lloyd), were apart of an alternate project, Murmur. Upon realization that Ross had the ability to produce what the other members of Murmur's quartet could provide, the trio decided to start their own project (Claire Voyant). With difficulties deciphering what to name the project, member Lloyd came across the name "Claire Voyant", in a 1940s comic-strip.

They released their debut in 1995 independently, under self label Nocturne. Eventually gaining the attention of German label, Hyperium Records. Hyperium included Claire Voyant's song; Her on their Heavenly Voices IV compilation album - which garnered the project viable notability within the European market. Hyperium went on to distribute their next album; Time and the Maiden. Their third album, Love Is Blind, was released in 2002, on Philadelphia indie label Metropolis. The Philadelphian label also re-releasing the previously mentioned; Time and the Maiden, with bonus tracks for their US market. The reissued album peaked at #29, on the CMJ RPM Charts in the U.S.

The project was disbanded on September 22, 2009 - only shortly after the release of its fourth studio album; Lustre. The album coincidentally being the first release after their seven year hiatus.

Discography

Studio albums
 Claire Voyant  (eponymous debut), 1995 (Remastered and re-released in 1997, 2000, and 2010)
 Time and the Maiden  1998, (Re-released in 2000 with three bonus tracks)
 Love Is Blind 2002
 Lustre 2009

Other
 'Time Again''  A Collection of Remixes, 2000

Members
 Victoria Lloyd – vocals
 Chris Ross – keyboards and programming
 Ben Fargen – guitars
 Garin Casaleggio – drums and percussion

References

External links
 
 

Musical groups established in 1995
American gothic rock groups
Dream pop musical groups
American dark wave musical groups
Musical groups from Sacramento, California
Metropolis Records artists
Dependent Records artists
Downtempo musicians
Trip hop groups